Front in the Rear of the Enemy is a 1981 Soviet war film directed by Igor Gostev and Victor Kulle.

The film is the third part in a trilogy directed by Igor Gostev about partisan resistance against the Nazi occupation of the Soviet Union during WWII. The first part is Front Without Flanks (1975). The second part is Front Beyond the Front Line (1977). All three screenplays were written by KGB Officer Semyon Tsvigun.

Vyacheslav Tikhonov starred as Soviet Army Officer Mlynsky, the commander of the partisan group in all three films.

Plot 
It is 1944. Lt. Colonel Mlynsky's partisan detachment is tasked with fostering the international unification of Poles, Czechs, and Slovaks in order to capture a training ground with them where they are testing secret fascist weapon.

Cast 
 Vyacheslav Tikhonov as Colonel Mlynsky
 Valeriya Zaklunnaya as Irina Petrovna
 Evgeniy Matveev as Simerenko
 Ivan Lapikov as Erofeich
 Aleksandr Mikhaylov
 Vaiva Mainelyte
 Tofik Mirzoyev
 Viktor Shulgin as Khvat
 Lev Polyakov as Fridrich von Büttsov
 Leonid Dyachkov

References

External links 
 

1981 films
1980s Russian-language films
Soviet war films
Soviet World War II films
Russian World War II films